Sant'Adriano al Foro was a church in Rome, formerly in the Curia Julia in the Forum Romanum and a cardinal-deaconry (a titular church for a Cardinal-deacon).

The church 

The Church of Sant'Adriano al Foro (Italian for St. (H)Adrian at the Roman Forum) was a conversion of the Curia Julia, which had housed the Senate of Ancient Rome, by Pope Honorius I in 630.

The end of the sixth and the beginning of the seventh century mark for Rome a period of profound decay. The curia had been abandoned until Honorius decided to erect the church.

Its name refers to the martyr Adrian of Nicomedia. Paintings are still visible in a side chapel which depict scenes from the life of St. Adrian; there are also some Byzantine paintings. It was designated by Pope Sergius I (687-701) as the starting point for the litanies during certain the procession liturgical feasts of the Virgin Mary, Presentation in the Temple, Annunciation, Assumption and Nativity. Pope Gregory IX made substantial changes to the building in 1228. In the 17th century its large bronze doors were moved by order of Pope Alexander VII to adorn the main portal of the Basilica of St. John Lateran.

Reconstruction as Curia Julia 
Its structure was modified multiple times before it was deconsecrated in the 1930s to recover the ancient structure of the building. On either side of the entrance are niches corresponding to medieval burials. The painting of the Holy Family, a product of the school of Raphael, was moved to the modern Church of Santa Maria della Mercede (1958), and the dedication to Saint Adrian added to that church.

Cardinal deaconry 
It was established in 734 as Cardinal Deaconry of S. Adriano al Foro.

On 25 January 1946, the title was suppressed to establish the Cardinal Deaconry of S. Paolo alla Regola.

Cardinal deacons
The following Cardinals have been Cardinal deacons of the Deaconry, except in special circumstances, which are noted by italics.

 Blessed Berardo dei Marsi (1099 – 1100)
 Matthaeus ( - 1127/1128) (promoted to Cardinal Priest of S. Pietro in Vincoli)
 Pierre (1127.12 – 1130), later Pseudocardinal-Priest of S. Eusebio (1130 – death 1130?)
 Guido (1130 – 1138?)
 Germano (1130.03.29 – ?), pseudocardinal created by Antipope Anacletus II 
 Ubaldo Aucingoli (1138 – May 1141), appointed Cardinal-priest of Santa Prassede
 Gilberto [Ghilibertus] (1141 – 1143.12.17)
 Giovanni Paparoni (1143.12.17 – 1151.03.02)
 Alberto di Morra (1155.12 – 1158), later Pope Gregory VIII
 Cinzio Papareschi (1158.02 – 1178.09)
 Eutichio (1178.09.22 – 1178?)
 Rainier (1178.09.22 – 1182.08)
 Gerardo (1182 – 1208)
 Angelo (1212.02.18 – 1215.11.29)
 Stefano de Normandis dei Conti (1216 – 1228)
 Goffredo da Trani (1244.05.28 – 1245)
 Ottobono de Fieschi (1251.12 – 1276.07.11), later Pope Adrian V
 Napoleone Orsini (1288.05.16 – 1342.03.23)
 Rinaldo Orsini (1350.12.17 – 1374.06.06)
 Gentile di Sangro (1378.09.18 – 1385.12)
 Ludovico Fieschi (1385.01 – 1423.04.03)
 Bonifacio Ammannati (1397.12.21 – death 1399.07.19), pseudo-cardinal created by Antipope Benedict XIII 
 Hugues de Lusignan (1426.05.27 – 1431.03.11)
 Stefano Nardini (1473.05.07 – 1476), Cardinal priest pro hac vice 
 Giovanni d’Aragona (1477.12.12 – 1480.01.14); promoted Cardinal priest pro hac vice (1480.01.14 – 1483.09.10)
 Cardinal Giovanni Conti (1485.10.18 – 1489.03.09 in commendam, while Cardinal-Priest of Ss. Nereo ed Achilleo (1483.11.15 – 1489.03.09)
 Pierre d'Aubusson (1489.03.23 – 1503.07.03)
 François Guillaume de Castelnau de Clermont-Lodève (1503.12.06 – 1509.05.02), in commendam (1509.05.02 – 1511.03.17)
 Bandinello Sauli (1511.03.17 – 1511.10.24)
 Agostino Trivulzio (1517.07.06 – 1537.08.17); in commendam 1537.08.17 – 1537.09.06 while transferred as Cardinal-Deacon of S. Eustachio (1537.08.17 – 1537.09.06), finally again Cardinal-Deacon of S. Adriano al Foro (1537.09.06 – 1548.03.30)
 Jean du Bellay (1548.04.09 – 1549.02.25, Cardinal priest pro hac vice 
 Odet de Coligny de Châtillon (1549.02.25 – 1563.03.31), became a Protestant, and gave up the Cardinalate and his Deaconry.
 Innico d’Avalos d’ Aragona, Military Order of Saint James the Sword (O.S.), (1563.07.30 – 1565.01.19); promoted Cardinal priest pro hac vice (1480.01.14 – 1483.09.10)
 Fulvio Giulio della Corgna, (O.B.E.) (1567.03.03 – 1574.05.05, Cardinal priest pro hac vice 
 Prospero Santacroce (1574.05.05 – 1583.03.04), Cardinal priest pro hac vice
 Andrzej Báthory (1584.07.23 – 1587.01.07)
 Girolamo Mattei (1587.01.14 – 1587.04.20)
 Agostino Cusani (1589.01.09 – 1591.01.14)
 Odoardo Farnese (1591.11.20 – 1595.06.12)
 Francesco Mantica (1596.06.21 – 1597.01.24)
 Giovanni Battista Deti (1599.03.17 – 1599.12.15)
 Alessandro d'Este (1600.04.17 – 1600.11.15)
 Giovanni Doria (1605.12.05 – 1623.10.02)
 Louis de Nogaret de La Valette (1623.11.20 – 1639.09.27)
 Achille d’Estampes de Valençay (1644.05.02 – 1646.06.27)
 Francesco Maidalchini (1647.12.16 – 1653.05.05)
 Decio Azzolini (1654.03.23 – 1668.03.12)
 Carlo Cerri (1670.05.19 – 1690.05.14)
 Giovanni Francesco Albani (1690.05.22 – 1700.03.30) (later Pope Clement XI)
 Pietro Priuli (1706.06.25 – 1720.05.06)
 Alessandro Albani (1721.09.24 – 1722.09.23)
 Giulio Alberoni (1724.06.12 – 1728.09.20)
 Neri Maria Corsini (1731.01.08 – 1737.05.06)
 Marcellino Corio (1739.09.30 – 1742.02.20)
 Girolamo De Bardi (1743.09.23 – 1753.05.28)
 Giovanni Francesco Banchieri (1753.12.10 – 1763.10.18)
 Enea Silvio Piccolomini (1766.12.01 – 1768.11.18)
 Carlo Livizzani Forni (1785.04.11 – 1794.02.21)
 Luigi Gazzoli (1803.09.26 – 1809.01.23)
 Lorenzo Prospero Bottini (1817.11.15 – 1818.08.11)
 Cesare Guerrieri Gonzaga (1819.12.17 – 1832.02.05)
 Giuseppe Ugolini (1838.09.13 – 1855.12.17)
 Camillo Mazzella, Jesuits (S.J.- (1886.06.10 – 1896.06.22)
 José de Calasanz Félix Santiago Vives y Tutó, O.F.M. Cap. (1899.06.22 – 1913.09.07)
 Evaristo Lucidi (1923.12.23 – 1929.03.31)

References

Bibliography
 Michele Dattoli, L'aula del Senato Romano e la chiesa di S. Adriano (Roma: Maglione & Strini, 1921). 
 Antonio Nibby, Roma nell'anno MDCCCXXXVIII: pte. I-II. Antica (Roma: Tipografia delle belle arti, 1839),  pp. 27–32.

Sources and external links
 , original pictures of the exterior of the church and its conversion
 , original picture of the pre-1930 interior of the church

Deconsecrated Roman Catholic churches in Rome
Roman Senate